Holu may refer to:
Holu language
Holu, Iran, a village in Hormozgan Province, Iran